Wikifunctions is a collaboratively edited catalog of computer functions to enable the creation, modification, and reuse of source code. It is closely related to Abstract Wikipedia, an extension of Wikidata to create a language-independent version of Wikipedia using its structured data. Provisionally named Wikilambda, the definitive name of Wikifunctions was announced on 22 December 2020 following a naming contest. Wikifunctions will be the first new Wikimedia project to launch since Wikidata in 2012.

It was retired on 30 October 2022.

References

External links

Project overview
Project updates

Advertising-free websites
Computer-related introductions in 2020
Creative Commons-licensed websites
Internet properties established in 2020
Semantic Web
Wikidata
Wikimedia projects
Wikipedia